Ranawakaarachchige Solomon Perera was a Ceylonese politician. He was the Minister of Information and Broadcasting in the Second Sirimavo Bandaranaike cabinet and was the member of Parliament of Sri Lanka from Kelaniya representing the Sri Lanka Freedom Party in 1960 to 1977. He unsuccessfully contested the March 1960 parliamentary election

References

Posts ministers of Sri Lanka
Members of the 5th Parliament of Ceylon
Members of the 6th Parliament of Ceylon
Members of the 7th Parliament of Ceylon
Sri Lanka Freedom Party politicians
Sinhalese politicians

Date of death missing
Year of death missing